Abraham Castillo Mora (died 1910)  was a Salvadoran politician and military officer from Sonsonate who served as governor of the Ahuachapán and Sonsonate departments, as well as being a deputy of the Legislative Assembly of El Salvador for Sonsonate. He was involved in several land disputes during the late-1890s.

Military and political career 

He served as a deputy of the Legislative Assembly of El Salvador for the department of Sonsonate from 1879 to 1880, where he was born. He served as military judge of Ahuachapán in April 1881, and later as its governor in 1882. He held the military position of Commander of Arms and served as the governor of Sonsonate under Presidents Rafael Zaldívar (1876–1885) and Carlos Ezeta (1890–1894).

Land disputes 

In 1896, Castillo Mora bought 4 caballerías (180 hectares) land in Dolores, Cabañas, for 4,200 pesos from partidor Luciano Argueta which caused a controversy with another partidor, Simeón Morán, which ended with the intervention of President Rafael Antonio Gutiérrez. Due to peasants from El Volcán de Santa Ana occupying the land he purchased, he attempted to sell the land to the government, however, a government legal advisor rejected the offer believing that the purchase would be unconstitutional, advising him to take the issue to court instead. He also attempted to buy land in Ataco, Ahuachapán, but the department's governor prevented him from doing so.

References

Citations

Bibliography 

Year of birth missing
1910 deaths
19th-century Salvadoran people
Salvadoran military personnel
People from Sonsonate Department